Goalball at the 2015 ASEAN Para Games was held at Hall D, Marina Bay Sands, Singapore.

Medal table

Medalists

External links
 8th ASEAN Para Games 2015 - Singapore

2015 ASEAN Para Games
Goalball at the ASEAN Para Games